New Testament Studies is a peer-reviewed academic journal published by Cambridge University Press under the auspices of the Studiorum Novi Testamenti Societas. The scope of the journal are short studies and articles on issues pertaining to the origins, history, and theology of early Christianity and the New Testament, including studies in its history of interpretation and effects. The editor is Francis Watson (University of Durham).

External links 
 

Cambridge University Press academic journals
Journals about ancient Christianity
Publications established in 1955
Multilingual journals
Quarterly journals
Academic journals associated with learned and professional societies
Biblical studies journals